Chipollino is a 1972 Soviet musical comedy film directed by . The film is also known as Cipollino (International informal title and English / Italian title).

Plot
Residents of the village where the Chipollino boy-onion live, gathered in the market square for a solemn meeting with Prince Lemon, who had come to them. In a crush that arose from a large number of people gathered,  Cipollino's father Cipollone, accidentally stepped on the prince's leg and was imprisoned, like a rebel and troublemaker.

Cast 
Gianni Rodari as Storyteller
Aleksandr Yelistratov as Chipollino
Vladimir Basov as Prince Lemon
Rina Zelyonaya as Countess Cherry
Aleksandra Panova as Countess Cherry
Vitaly Kerdimun as Viscount Cherry
Nadir Malishevsky as Lord Tomato before the earthquake
Vladimir Belokurov as Lord Tomato after the earthquake
Georgiy Vitsin as Lawyer Pea
Roman Tkachuk as Mastino
Aleksandr Kuznetsov as Chief of staff
Georgi Georgiu as Patison
Rudolf Rudin as Mr. Carotino
Aleksei Smirnov as Cipollone
Natalya Krachkovskaya as Cipolla
Viktor Bajkov as Mr. Squash
Yevgenia Melnikova as Mrs. Pumpkin
Viktor Kolpakov as Master Raisin
Anatoly Kubatsky as Aubergine
Pavel Vinnik as Pear
Maryana Smirnova as Strawberry
Yekaterina Mojseyenko as Strawberry
Yekaterina Semochkina as Radish
 Maria Vinogradova as town-dweller

External links 

1972 films
1970s musical comedy films
Soviet musical comedy films
Russian musical comedy films
1970s Russian-language films
Films based on Italian novels
Mosfilm films
Films based on children's books
Films shot in Russia
Films shot in Rome
1970s prison films
1972 comedy films